CDF is a three-letter acronym that may refer to:

Mathematics, science, and computers
.cdf (formerly known as "AIA Format"), the ANDI/netCDF scientific data interchange file format
Cation diffusion facilitator, transport protein
Channel Definition Format, an XML standard
Chip Description File, a genomic analysis file format
Chlorinated dibenzofuran(s), a.k.a. polychlorinated dibenzofurans
Cohen–Daubechies–Feauveau wavelet
Collider Detector at Fermilab
Comma-delimited format, now referred to as .csv (comma-separated values)
Common Data Format, NASA software
Composite Document File, a Microsoft compound document file format
Compound Document Format, a set of W3C standards on a specific compound document format
Computable Document Format, a format for interactive data visualizations
Cumulative distribution function

Organizations
California Department of Forestry and Fire Protection
Canal del Fútbol (Chile)
Ceylon Defence Force
Chief of the Defence Force (disambiguation), position in multiple countries
Children's Defense Fund (U.S.)
Ciskei Defence Force
Congregation for the Doctrine of the Faith
Constituency Development Fund
Cooperative Development Foundation (U.S.)
Crypto Developers Forum

Transport
Cardiff Central railway station, National Rail station code CDF
Cortina Airport, Italy (IATA code CDF)

Other
CDF Croisières de France, a cruise ship operator
Chesapeake Detention Facility
Clostridium difficile (bacteria)
ESA's Concurrent Design Facility at ESTEC
Congolese franc, the ISO 4217 code for the currency of the Democratic Republic of Congo
Constructive developmental framework for psychological assessment
Carlos Diego Ferreira, a Brazilian mixed martial artist